James Macaulay Smith (November 20, 1931 – March 17, 2021) was an American sports shooter. He competed in the 300 metre rifle event at the 1956 Summer Olympics.  He graduated from Harvard University and Harvard Law School.

Smith died in Lexington, Massachusetts on March 17, 2021, at the age of 89.

References

External links
 

1931 births
2021 deaths
American male sport shooters
Olympic shooters of the United States
Shooters at the 1956 Summer Olympics
Sportspeople from Waltham, Massachusetts
Harvard Crimson rowers
Harvard Law School alumni